Vladimír Županský (September 24, 1869 - September 20, 1928) was a Czech painter and graphic artist. He  designed posters and book covers. He is best remembered for his curtain painting in the Vinohrady Theatre which is said to "depict a naked Muse of a comely girlish figure descending on pinions among inspired artists".

References

Czech graphic designers
1869 births
1928 deaths
19th-century Czech painters
19th-century male artists
Czech male painters
20th-century Czech painters
20th-century Czech male artists